MalakAbad (also spelled:  MalkAbad  or Malakane E Ghara Chargurai MalakAbad or MalikAbad;) is an administrative unit in Tehsil Timargara of Lower Dir District in the Khyber Pakhtunkhwa province of Pakistan.

References

http://www.getamap.net/maps/pakistan/north-west_frontier/_chargurai/

Populated places in Lower Dir District